Klenn Creek is a stream in Ripley County in the U.S. state of Missouri. It is a tributary of the Current River.

Klenn Creek has the name of Frank Klenn, the original owner of the site.

See also
List of rivers of Missouri

References

Rivers of Ripley County, Missouri
Rivers of Missouri